The 1839 Vermont gubernatorial election was held on September 3, 1839. Incumbent Whig Governor Silas H. Jennison defeated Democratic nominee Nathan Smilie with 52.47% of the vote.

General election

Candidates
Silas H. Jennison, Whig, incumbent Governor
Nathan Smilie, Democratic, businessman, former member of the Vermont House of Representatives

Results

Notes

References

1839
Vermont
Gubernatorial